Szegedi EAC (Szegedi Egyetemi Atlétikai Club, also known as SZEAC) was a Hungarian football club from the town of Szeged.

History
The club was founded in 1921 as Kitartás Egyetemi Atlétikai Klub. In 1954 the club took the place of Szegedi Honvéd SE in the Hungarian League, but were relegated at the end of the season. They managed to come back in 1956, only to be relegated again two years later. The next season they started their longest spell in the top tier, which lasted six years. They were promoted to and relegated from the top tier another seven times after that. In 1976 the club merged with Szegedi AK and continued under the name Szegedi Egyetemi és Olajipari Atlétikai Klub.

In total the club played 21 seasons in the Hungarian top tier before being dissolved in 1999, eight years after their last appearance in the aforementioned league. A successor club, Szeged LC, was formed that managed to once again reach the highest division in the 1999–00 season. They, however, were immediately relegated and disbanded the same year.

Names
 1921 – 1940 : Kitartás Egyetemi Athlétikai Club (KEAC)
 1940 – 1948 : Szegedi Egyetemi Athlétikai Club (SZEAC)
 1949 – 1956 : Szegedi Haladás
 1956 – 1969 : Szegedi Egyetemi Athlétikai Club (SZEAC)
 1969 – 1976 : Szegedi Egyetemi és Olajipari Sport Club (SZEOL)
 1977 – 1985 : Szegedi Egyetemi és Olajipari Atlétikai Klub (SZEOL AK)
 1985 – 1987 : Szegedi Egyetemi és Olajipari – Délép Sportegyesület (SZEOL-Délép SE)
 1987 – 1993 : Szeged Sport Club
 1993 : Szeged Torna Egylet
 1993 – 1995 : Szeged Football Club
 1995 – 1999 : Szegedi Egyetemi Athlétikai Club (SZEAC)

Managers
 Károly Lakat (1956–57)
 György Szűcs

References

External links
 Profile

Football clubs in Hungary
Defunct football clubs in Hungary
1920 establishments in Hungary